Poklok-Kamrang Assembly constituency is one of the 32 assembly constituencies of Sikkim a north east state of India. Poklok-Kamrang is part of Sikkim Lok Sabha constituency.

Members of Legislative Assembly

Election results

2019 By-Election

In 2019 Sikkim Legislative Assembly election, Pawan Kumar Chamling of former ruling SDF won in both Poklok-Kamrang and Namchi-Singhithang constituencies, so he relinquished Poklok-Kamrang seat.

In the by-election, ruling SKM sent its president and incumbent Chief Minister, Prem Singh Tamang (P. S. Golay) to Poklok-Kamrang constituency. Former ruling SDF participated in Sikkim Legislative Assembly election as the opposition for the first time in 25 years. Opposition INC boycotted this by-election, and HSP didn't send its candidate to this constituency.

As the result, Prem Singh Tamang of SKM defeated his nearest rival Moses Rai of SDF.

2019
Ruling SDF sent its president and incumbent Chief Minister, Pawan Kumar Chamling to Poklok-Kamrang constituency. Opposition HSP and SRP sent their candidates to Poklok-Kamrang for the first time.

Pawan Kumar Chamling of SDF defeated his nearest rival Kharka Bahadur Rai of opposition SKM.

2014
Opposition SKM sent its candidate to Poklok-Kamrang for the first time.

Kedar Nath Rai of ruling SDF defeated his nearest rival Bhoj Raj Rai of SKM.

See also
 Poklok
 Kamrang
 South Sikkim district
 List of constituencies of Sikkim Legislative Assembly

References

Assembly constituencies of Sikkim
Namchi district